Prairie City may refer to some places in the United States:

 Prairie City, California, south of Folsom
 Prairie City, Illinois
 Prairie City, Indiana
 Prairie City, Iowa
 Prairie City, Kansas, a ghost town in Douglas County, Kansas
 Prairie City, Missouri
 Prairie City, Oregon
 Prairie City, South Dakota